The Comfort-class hospital ships were a United States Navy World War II-era hospital ship design. Three vessels (Comfort, Hope, and Mercy) were built using these specifications. All ships were constructed in 1943 by the Consolidated Steel Corporation before being decommissioned in 1946.

Comfort operated with a navy crew and army medical personnel throughout its short career.  All three ships of the class operated exclusively in the Pacific theater for the three years in which they were in service.

Ships

See also
 SS United States, a planned fast hospital ship.
 
 
 List of United States Navy hospital ships

References

Auxiliary ship classes of the United States Navy